State Route 149 (SR 149) is an east–west highway in Middle Tennessee. The road begins near Erin and ends just south of Clarksville.

Route description

Houston County

SR 149 begins in Houston County in Erin at an intersection with SR 49 near that route’s junction with SR 13 just outside of Erin. SR 149 then goes northward and crosses into Stewart County.

Stewart County

It continues north and becomes concurrent with SR 46 before entering Cumberland City. In Cumberland City, SR 46 breaks off and goes through downtown, while SR 149 bypasses the town to the east. It then intersects the short SR 434, a connector to SR 233 and provides access to the Cumberland Fossil Plant. SR 149 turns to the northeast to parallel the Cumberland River and enter Montgomery County.

Montgomery County

It then goes east through Palmyra before ending at intersection with SR 13 and SR 48 just south of Clarksville.

Major intersections

See also

References 

149
Transportation in Houston County, Tennessee
Transportation in Montgomery County, Tennessee
Transportation in Stewart County, Tennessee